= Eutre =

Town in ancient Arcadia

Eutre (Ancient Greek: Εὔτρη) was a town in ancient Arcadia, in the district Eutresia.
